KATM (103.3 MHz, Kat Country 103) is a commercial FM radio station in Modesto, California and also heard in the nearby cities of Stockton and Merced.  The station is owned by Cumulus Media and airs a country music format.  Its studios are in Stockton, and its transmitter is located off South Bird Road in Vernalis, California.

KATM often works with local charities and community organizations providing air time and fundraising opportunities, most notably the Make-A-Wish Foundation, St. Jude Children's Research Hospital, Toys for Tots, the Second Harvest Food Bank, the American Cancer Society and others.

The station hosts a yearly Listener Appreciation Concert. As the concert crowds have grown, the venues have been changed to accommodate the growing number of attendees. The June 2nd show at the Stanislaus County Fairgrounds hosted around 20,000 fans in Turlock, California.  In 2011, the Listener Appreciation Concert was held at Weber Point Event Center on the waterfront in Stockton, California.

History
On April 3, 1948, the station first signed on as KBEE-FM.  It was one of the first FM stations in Central California, and was owned by The McClatchy Company, which publishes the Modesto Bee newspaper, giving the station its call sign, KBEE.  A few years later, in 1951, McClatchy added an AM station, KBEE (970 AM).  At first, both stations were simulcast, but through the late 1960s, 70s and 80s, while the AM station carried a full service middle of the road music format, KBEE-FM had a largely automated beautiful music format.

In 1992, the station was purchased by Citadel Broadcasting and moved from easy listening to a hit country format, switching call letters to KATM (soon after the calls were made available after being used by a station in Colorado for about seven years)  under the helm of then Brand Manager, Scott Mahalick.  Citadel merged with Cumulus Media in 2011.  Through the years, KATM has continued as a country music station, and is among the top rated stations in both Modesto and Stockton, with significant listenership in the Merced radio market.

Past Listener Appreciation performers
Blake Shelton
Taylor Swift
Craig Morgan
Eric Church
The Band Perry
Lee Brice
Joe Nichols
Tracy Lawrence
Clay Walker
Jerrod Niemann
Eli Young Band
Lauren Alaina
Mark Chesnutt
Lee Ann Womack
Steve Holy
Montgomery Gentry
Toby Keith
Gretchen Wilson
Rascal Flatts
Thompson Square
Parmalee
Gloriana
Keith Anderson
Travis Tritt
Josh Turner
Carly Pearce
Chris Janson
Locash
Jordan Davis
Jimmie Allen
Mitchell Tenpenny
Cassadee Pope
Everette
Dillon Carmichael

Program directors
Scott Mahalick was the GM and spearheaded the branding of the "KAT". Mahalick went on to program in San Francisco, Seattle and now is at Portland, Oregon country station KUPL.
Ed Hill left the station to serve as OM at KUBL in Salt Lake City, Utah, in 1998. Hill left Citadel in 2011 to take on the job as program director of KMPS in Seattle, Washington.
Randy "Bubba" Black, a native of Manteca, California was a KATM employee, from 1994 to 2011. Black was elevated to mgmt in 1997 and was sent to Reno, NV and then returned to the station after the departure of his mentor Ed Hill. Black had programmed the Bull in Reno and served as program director for the KAT from 1998 until 2011. Black continued the KATM tradition of market dominance during his tenure. Bubba's work was entered and won the Radio Station Of the Year by the CMA, a nationally recognized award, Bubba Black and KATM were also the winners of the prestigious award the ST. Jude Children's Research Hospital Promotion
Of The Year for the now many times duplicated promotion The Quest For One Million Pennies netting the charity 36 Million Pennies.
Nikki Thomas, formerly of WKSF in Asheville, North Carolina and Infinity Broadcasting stations KWYE and KDJK in Fresno, California, came to work for the station as Music Director in 2006 and served as program director after Black left in February 2011 until moving to WIVK Knoxville. Thomas programmed both KATM and WIVK from August 2016 until December 2016 when Andy Winford was brought in as the new program director. KATM was noted in the Congressional Record by Rep. Dennis Cardoza for Community Service, May 15, 2012 
Andy Winford arrived in December 2016 and is the current program director. Winford was formerly the program director of KATS-FM and KIT-AM in Yakima, Washington, the operations manager of KCTR, KMHK, KKBR and KBUL-AM in Billings, Montana, the program director of CHBN/Edmonton, Canada, program director of KKBZ-FM and KHIT-FM in Fresno, California, and the operations manager of KURQ, KSLY & KSTT in San Luis Obispo, California.

Air staff
Morning Show (5am-10am): DJ Walker in the Morning with Jaimee Lee & Joe On The Go
Mid-Days (10am-2pm): Jaimee Lee
Afternoon Drive (2pm-7pm): Toni Marie
Evenings (7pm-12mid):Nights with Elaina
Overnight (12mid-5am):"Later with Lia"
Weekend's/Fill-ins:Tim Cruz
Weekend's/Fill-ins:Melissa McConnell
Assistant Program Director:Jaimee Lee
Program Director:Andy Winford

Awards
KATM won the Country Music Association Medium Market Station of the Year award in 2011. The station received the news via a phone call from CMA Entertainer of the Year Nominee Taylor Swift, October 17, 2011.
KATM won the Academy of Country Music Medium Market Station of the Year award in 2012.
KATM received their second Country Music Association "Medium Market Station of the Year" nomination September 3, 2014.
KATM Morning Show Personalities DJ Walker In The Morning were nominees for Medium Market Broadcast Personalities of the Year September 9, 2015.
KATM received their third Country Music Association "Medium Market Station of the Year" nomination August 31, 2016 
KATM was nominated in 2018 for the ACM Medium Market Station of the Year Award.
In 2020 KATM was nominated for both the ACM and CMA Medium Market Radio Station of the Year Awards.

References

External links
Kat Country 103's Official Website

ATM
Country radio stations in the United States
Mass media in San Joaquin County, California
Mass media in Stanislaus County, California
Cumulus Media radio stations
Radio stations established in 1948
1948 establishments in California